The Pennington School is a private (independent), coeducational college preparatory school for day and boarding students in sixth through twelfth grades, located in Pennington, New Jersey, a small community in the northeastern United States midway between New York City and Philadelphia in Mercer County, New Jersey.  The Head of School is Dr. William S. Hawkey, who assumed the position in July 2014.

As of the 2019–20 school year, the school had an enrollment of 534 students and 108.6 classroom teachers (on an FTE basis), for a student–teacher ratio of 4.9:1. The school's student body was 47.6% (254) White, 36.7% (196) two or more races, 6.9% (37) Asian, 5.2% (28) Black and 3.6% (19) Hispanic

Pennington is a member of the National Association of Independent Schools, the New Jersey Association of Independent Schools, the Association of Delaware Valley Independent Schools, and the General Board of Higher Education and Ministry of the United Methodist Church. The school has been accredited by the Middle States Association of Colleges and Schools Commission on Elementary and Secondary Schools since 1930; the accreditation expires in May 2025.

History 
The Pennington School was founded in 1838 during the Second Great Awakening as the Methodist Episcopal Male Seminary, a college preparatory school for boys, in order to secure "the education of the physical, the training of the mental, and the grounding of the soul in character."  Pennington officially became a coeducational institution, The Pennington Seminary and Female Collegiate Institute, in the fall of 1854.  In March 1910, Pennington would again become a school for boys, reverting to the name Pennington Seminary. Shortly afterward, the school's name evolved to its present form, sometimes with the addition of "for Boys." It was not until 1972 that Pennington once again became a coeducational institution. In 1975, the Center for Learning, one of the nation's leading secondary school programs for bright children with learning disabilities, was created within the school to serve a small number of college-preparatory students.

Academics 
The Pennington School offers a vigorous curriculum for students with strong academic ability and the desire to build a record of personal achievement appropriate for admission into some of the country's most demanding colleges and universities.  Middle school students have their own faculty dedicated to teaching children of this age (sixth through eighth grade).  Middle school courses include:  Algebra, American History and Government Applications, Art-o-Rama, Computer Skills, Earth Science, English, French, Geometry, German, Global Perspectives, Health, Humanities, Latin, Life Science, Math, Music, Physical Science, Spanish, Technology, Writer's Studio, and many elective offerings.  Upper School students are expected to seek personal excellence academically, socially, physically, and artistically.  They work closely with their advisors to create a challenging curriculum that helps them to grow as learners.  Upper School students are offered a full range of both Honors and Advanced Placement courses.

Visual and performing arts 
The Arts Department offers rich and varied courses and activities in drama, music, and the visual arts for both Middle School and Upper School students.  Students embrace their own creativity and gain a lifelong appreciation for the creativity of others.

Music 
Music courses include:  Chorus, Composition, Handbell Ensemble, Instrumental Ensemble, Instrumental Lab, Jazz Band, Keyboard, Music History, Music Technology, Music Theory, Orchestra, Pennington Singers, Pit Band, and Vocal Ensemble.

Drama 
Drama courses include:  Acting Shakespeare, Advanced Drama, Foundations in Drama, Public Speaking, Puppetry & Performance, Respect for Acting, Small Group Dynamics, and Stagecrafts.

Visual art 
Visual Art courses include:  Adobe Photoshop, Advanced Black & White Darkroom Skills, Alternative Processes, Ceramics, Digital Photography, Drawing, Painting, Sculpture, and Video Production.

Athletics
The Pennington School Red Hawks compete in the Patriot Conference, which includes the Gill St. Bernard's School, the Ranney School, the Purnell School, Stuart Country Day School, Wardlaw-Hartridge School, Timothy Christian School, Princeton Day School, and Saddle River Day School. In addition. Pennington competes regularly against The Peddie School, the Hun School of Princeton, and Lawrenceville School.

The Pennington School has 44 athletic teams on its campus. The Upper School sports include: boys varsity, JV, and Thirds soccer, girls varsity and JV soccer, varsity and JV field hockey, varsity and JV water polo, boys and girls cross country, girls varsity and JV tennis, cheerleading, girls varsity and JV basketball, boys varsity, JV, and Thirds basketball, winter track, varsity and JV ice hockey, varsity and JV boys and girls swimming, varsity and JV baseball, varsity softball, golf, boys varsity and JV tennis, boys varsity, JV, and Thirds lacrosse, girls varsity and JV lacrosse, and boys and girls spring track and field. The middle school also has sports, which includes field hockey, soccer, cross country, boys and girls basketball, swimming, boys lacrosse, and spring track and field.

Football 

The Pennington School is home to one of the country's longest-running football programs, dating back to 1879. Pennington Football competes in the Independence League, which is a league consisting of small schools from Pennsylvania and New Jersey; including Bristol, Academy of the New Church, Lower Moreland, Jenkintown, and Springfield Township.

Varsity hockey
Pennington's ice hockey program dates back to 1996–97, when a group of students was successful in starting a team. The Red Hawks play in the competitive Independent Hockey League, in which they were league champions in 2009.  Traditions include an annual game against the rival Hopewell Bulldogs, in which fans from both sides come out to support their team.  They also hold an annual alumni game during the weekend following Thanksgiving.

Girls' soccer 
Pennington's girls' soccer team has established itself as a perennial powerhouse and one of the top high school soccer programs in the nation. In 2008 the Pennington girls' soccer team finished the season with an undefeated record of 18–0, and was ranked as the consensus #1 team in the United States according to ESPN RISE and the National Soccer Coaches Association of America. During that season they captured their 6th consecutive NJSIAA Prep A State Title and their 2nd consecutive Mercer County Tournament Championship and won their seventh straight Prep A title in the 2009 season. In 2014, the team won its ninth Mercer County Championship title in a 12-year span.

Boys' soccer 

Captured the 2009 Prep B State tournament. The team competed in the 2010 Prep A State tournament and lost to the top ten nationally ranked team, Saint Benedict's Preparatory School 1–0. The team has sent recent players to Division I and Division III soccer programs.

Swimming 

The boys' team placed 1st at the 2010 N.J. Prep Patriot Championship Meet, 4th at Mercer County Tournament, and won their second NJSIAA "B" State Tournament. The girls' team won the Patriot Championship, placed 2nd at MCT's and won their 9th consecutive NJSIAA "B" state championship. Recent Pennington swimmers have gone on to compete at Division I and Division III colleges and universities.

Boys' basketball 

The team captured the 2009 and 2010 Mercer County Tournament championship and the 2010, 2013, 2014 and 2015 Prep B state championship.

Girls' basketball 
The team won back-to-back Prep B state championships in 2016 and 2017, beating Newark Academy and Morristown-Beard School, respectively. Also, in 2016 the girls advanced to the semi-final round of the Mercer County Tournament. In 2018, the girls lost to Trenton Catholic Academy by a score of 59–55 in the Mercer County Tournament (MCT), making it the first time Pennington had ever advanced to the finals in this tournament. In 2018, the girls' basketball team switched conferences, and began competing in the New Jersey Prep A state tournament; days after losing the MCT final, the team faced off against Pingry School in the finals of the Prep A tournament and won its third consecutive title with a 62–49 win.

Spring track 

Girls' – 2008 Patriot Conference Champions and 2008 Prep B State Champions

Boys' – 2003, 2005, 2009, 2010 Patriot Conference Champions

Recent Pennington track participants have gone on to compete at the Division I and Division III level at The University of Texas, Lafayette, West Point, McDaniel, St. Lawrence, Wheaton, TCNJ, Yale, UNC, UChicago, and Dickinson.

Clubs and activities 
"The Penntonian" - School Newspaper
"Penseman" - School Yearbook
Bowling Club (During the Winter (2nd) Trimester)
Pennington Sports News (PSN)
Mock Trial
Model UN
Robotics Club
ACSL Programming Contest
Pennyroyal (Literary Magazine)
Aerospace Club and Aviation Club
American Sign Language Club
Amnesty International Student Club
Animal Rights Club
Art Club
Better Kitchen Sink
Biology Club
Black Student Union
Book Club
Campus Guides
Campus Ministry Club
Chess Club
Community Service
Computer Science Competition Club
Chorus
Dance Club
Debate Team
Dramatic Society
East Asian Student Union
Exchange of Many Cultures
Eye to Eye
Fall Play
Fashion Club
French Club
German Club
Girls in STEM
Green Team
Hall Prefects
History Club
International Studies Student Alliance
Intersectional Feminism Club
Investment Club
Jazz Band
Junior Proctors
Latin Club
Latinx Affinity Group
Learning Difference Alliance
Library Proctors
Math Competition Club
Model United Nations
Music Technology Club
Muslim Student Alliance
Odyssey of the Mind (Middle School)
Open Studio: Visual Art
Orchestra
Our Minds Matter
Peer Leaders
Peer Tutoring Club
Pennington Jewish Community
Pennington Singers
The Penntonian (newspaper)
Pennyroyal (literary magazine)
Penseman (yearbook)
Philosophy Club
Pit Band
Poetry and Creative Club
Politics Club
Private Instrumental/Voice lessons
PSCFit 
Science Competition Club
School Planning in Malawi
Ski Club
SoundProof (a cappella)
South Asian Student Society
Spanish Club
Spectrum (LGBTQ+/ally group)
Sports Statistics Club
Spring Play (Upper and Middle School plays)
STEM Leaders
STEM Tutoring
Student Ambassadors
Student Government
Tech Crew
Technology Club
Treble Tones
Ultimate Frisbee
United People of Many Colors
Untold Gallery (Malawi)
Winter Musical

Cervone Center for Learning 
The Edmund V. Cervone Center for Learning, founded in 1975 by Dr. Edmund Cervone, provides a program of academic support for bright students with learning disabilities. In addition to preparing students for college-level study, the program has three objectives. The primary goal is to identify each student's educational difficulties and to address them through individually tailored academic supports and accommodations. A second goal is to help the student fully participate in the School's traditional college preparatory curriculum. The third goal is for most students to transition out of the Cervone Center classes before graduation from Pennington and to achieve the independence and confidence that will assure their success in college.

Notable alumni

 Carmen J. Armenti (1929–2001), restaurateur and politician who served as the mayor of Trenton, New Jersey from 1966 to 1970 and again from 1989 to 1990.
 Esther E. Baldwin (1840–1910; graduated 1859), missionary, teacher, translator, writer, editor
 Nicole Baxter (born 1994), professional soccer player who plays as a midfielder for the National Women's Soccer League club Sky Blue FC.
 Benjamin T. Biggs (1821–1893), member of the U.S. House of Representatives from 1869 to 1873, 38th Governor of Delaware.
 Grant Billmeier (born 1984), former professional basketball player who transferred from Pennington after his freshman year.
 Rudy Boschwitz (born 1930, class of 1947): United States Senator, former chairman National Republican Senatorial Committee.
 Borden Parker Bowne (1847–1910, class of 1866), Christian philosopher, clergyman, and theologian in the Methodist tradition. Nominated for the Nobel Prize in Literature nine times.
 Amber Brooks (born 1991, class of 2009): professional soccer player for Houston Dash of the NWSL. She has played with FC Bayern Munich in Munich, Germany, and the United States Women's National Soccer Team
 Philip L. Cannon, first Lieutenant Governor of Delaware (1901–1905) and son of Governor William Cannon 
 Lucilla Green Cheney (1853–1878), physician and medical missionary
 Alexandra Cooper, podcaster and host of viral Barstool podcast "Call Her Daddy".
 Stephen Crane (1871–1900, class of 1887; never graduated), author of The Red Badge of Courage and Maggie: A Girl of the Streets. 
 David Curtiss (born 2002), competitive swimmer who set the national high school record in the 50-yard freestyle.
 John Franklin Fort (1852–1920), 33rd Governor of New Jersey, who served from 1908 to 1911.
 Dan Frankel (born 1956, class of 1974), politician who has been a member of the Pennsylvania House of Representatives for the 23rd District. 
 Stephen O. Garrison (1853–1900, class of 1872), Methodist minister and scholar who founded The Training School in Vineland, New Jersey.
 L. Fred Gieg (1890–1977), football and basketball player and coach.
Benjamin Golub (class of 2003), economics professor who has taught at Harvard and Northwestern.
 Louise Manning Hodgkins (1846–1935), 19th-century educator, author and missionary newspaper editor.
 George Howell (1859–1913), member of the U.S. House of Representatives from Pennsylvania.
 Dontae Johnson (born 1991, class of 2010), cornerback for the Kansas City Chiefs of the NFL.
 Robyn Jones (born 1985), professional soccer goalkeeper who played two years for the Philadelphia Independence of Women's Professional Soccer.
 William Mastrosimone (born 1947, class of 1966), playwright.
 Eddie Picken (1907–1994, class of 1927), early professional basketball player.
 Ralph Lane Polk (1849–1923), founder, publisher and president of R.L. Polk & Company.
 James Fowler Rusling (valedictorian, Class of 1852) brigadier general in the American Civil War, author of "Men and Things I Saw in the Civil War Days", "Across America", and "European Days and Ways".
 Casey Ramirez (born 1989), soccer defender who played for the Portland Thorns FC of the National Women's Soccer League
 Myles Stephens (born 1997), basketball player for Kangoeroes Mechelen.
 Stephen Tan (born 1961), executive director of Asia Financial Group and chairman of Bangkok Mercantile (Hong Kong) Company Ltd.
 Robert Love Taylor (1850–1912), represented Tennessee's 1st district in the United States House of Representatives from 1879 to 1881, Governor of Tennessee from 1887 to 1891, and again from 1897 to 1899, and subsequently served as a United States Senator from 1907 until his death.
 Ethan Vanacore-Decker (born 1994), professional soccer player for the Swope Park Rangers in the United Soccer League.
 Kenneth Yen (1965–2018), Taiwanese businessman, former Chairman of Yulon

References

External links 
The Pennington School website
History of The Pennington School
Data for The Pennington School, National Center for Education Statistics
The Association of Boarding Schools profile

1838 establishments in New Jersey
Boarding schools in New Jersey
Educational institutions established in 1838
New Jersey Association of Independent Schools
Private high schools in Mercer County, New Jersey
Private middle schools in New Jersey
Methodist schools in the United States
Pennington, New Jersey
Christian schools in New Jersey